The 1985 Maui Invitational Tournament was the second edition of an early-season college basketball tournament that was played November 22–23, 1985. The tournament, which began the year prior in 1984, was part of the 1985-86 NCAA Division I men's basketball season.  The tournament was played at the Lahaina Civic Center in Maui, Hawaii and was won by the Michigan. It was the first title for the program and its head coach Bill Frieder.

Bracket

References

Maui Invitational Tournament
Maui Invitational